"Amanda" is a 1973 song written by Bob McDill and recorded by both Don Williams (1973) and Waylon Jennings (1974). "Amanda" was Waylon Jennings's eighth solo number one on the country chart.  The single stayed at number one for three weeks on the Billboard Hot Country Singles chart.

As recorded by Jennings, "Amanda" had been a track on his 1974 album The Ramblin' Man, but was not released as a single at that time; two other tracks, "I'm a Ramblin' Man" and "Rainy Day Woman," were. More than 4½ years later, new overdubs were added to the original track and placed on his first greatest hits album. In April 1979 the song was issued as a single, and it soon became one of the biggest country hits of 1979. "Amanda" is a love song of 2 young people growing up and falling in love.

Other versions
"Amanda" was first recorded and released as a single by country singer Don Williams in the summer of 1973 as the flip side of his No. 12 hit "Come Early Morning." Williams' version reached No. 33 on the Billboard Hot Country Singles chart.

The master for both "Come Early Morning" and "Amanda," along with Williams' other recordings for JMI Records, were sold to ABC-Dot Records in 1974.

Chris Stapleton covered this song on the 2017 tribute album to Don Williams "Gentle Giants: The Songs of Don Williams".

Billy Joe Royal released a version of the song.

Chart performance

Don Williams

Waylon Jennings

Year-end charts

References

External links
 
 

1973 singles
1979 singles
Don Williams songs
Billy Joe Royal songs
Waylon Jennings songs
Songs written by Bob McDill
Song recordings produced by Allen Reynolds
ABC Records singles
RCA Records singles
1973 songs